Jessica Greco (born October 14, 1974) is a Canadian actress and comedian best known for playing Karen Thurston, the dead teenage daughter of a chemical factory worker, in the 1997 television adaptation of the Goosebumps book Welcome to Dead House. Greco has gone on to act in numerous television and film roles, including in the films Twitches, Treed Murray and Girl in the Bunker.

Personal life 

Greco was born in Thornhill, Ontario. She began her acting career at a young age, studying at The Neighbourhood Playhouse, and alongside acting, went on to create an award-winning web series, That’s My DJ. Greco is also a comedy writer and performer, having co-founded the Canadian Comedy Award nominated sketch troupe Dame Judy Dench, and co-created the Fringe 2017 piece 32 Short Sketches About Bees which went on to win Second City's "Outstanding New Comedy" award and the "My Theatre award for Best Comedy Sketch/Improv". She is active on social media, and maintains a Twitter account. Greco continues to be involved in regular comedy performances in Toronto, Canada.

Acting career
Greco has acted in a number of films, short films and television productions, mostly Canadian-based. She is recognized outside of Canada mostly for her role in Welcome to Dead House, a made-for-TV film and season 2 instalment of Goosebumps, which had mainstream recognition from an international audience. Greco is known for her distinctive appearance in the film, which included braided red hair, an old hat, and a shirt with an unknown letter G oval crown symbol on the front. Greco's appearance as Karen Thurston was the inspiration for the main character in the Canadian young adult horror novella The Beaches. More recently, Greco has appeared in roles for films Tammy's Always Dying and The Animal Project. Recent television roles include acting in Tiny Pretty Things and Tokens, the latter of for which she was nominated for The 18th Annual ACTRA Awards in Toronto's "Outstanding Performance (Female)".

Filmography 

Filmography excludes roles in television shows, except for made-for-TV films and short films.

References

External links
 
 Jessica Greco's Official Twitter Page

1974 births
Living people
Canadian television actresses
Canadian film actresses
Canadian women comedians
Actresses from Ontario
People from Thornhill, Ontario